The California Comprehensive Computer Data Access and Fraud Act is in §502 of the California Penal Code.

According to the State Administrative Manual of California, the purposes is as follows:

The Comprehensive Computer Data Access and Fraud Act (Penal Code Section 502) affords protection to individuals, businesses, and governmental agencies from tampering, interference, damage, and unauthorized access to lawfully created computer data and computer systems. It allows for civil action against any person convicted of violating the criminal provisions for compensatory damages.

Penalties Under the CCCDAFA:

According to the California Comprehensive Computer Data Access and Fraud Act, violations of the law are subject to criminal penalties. For violating some of the more major premises of the Act, the punishment can be up to a $10,000 fine and a 3-year prison term.

 
Notable cases:

'People v. Hawkins'  (2002)
Hawkins had source code from his previous employer on his home machine.
'Facebook v. ConnectU', LLC, (2007)
ConnectU gathered Facebook data using bots
Facebook, Inc. v. Power Ventures, Inc.
Power Ventures scraped data from Facebook
Facebook, Inc. v. John Does 1-10 (2007)
Various people, including some associated with Istra Holdings, scraped Facebook for data.
SCEA v. George Hotz et al. (2011)
Jailbreaking of the PlayStation 3 by George Hotz & associates of fail0verflow

See also 

Illegal number
John Doe
Mens rea
Terms of service

External links 
Text of code, at Findlaw

References 

Comprehensive Computer Data Access And Fraud Act
Fraud legislation
Fraud in the United States